Western Symphony is a ballet made by New York City Ballet co-founder and founding choreographer George Balanchine to American folk tunes arranged by Hershy Kay. It premiered on September 7, 1954 at the City Center of Music and Drama in New York. The ballet was originally presented in practice clothes without scenery. Scenery by John Boyt and costumes by Karinska were added in 1955. Lighting was originally by Jean Rosenthal and subsequently Mark Stanley. Set in the Western United States, the ballet features cowboys and dance hall girls (or saloon girls).

Setting
The ballet follows no plot but presents several short stories throughout the ballet (similar to Serenade) outside a saloon. It is almost a satire on classical ballet with imitations of Giselle and Swan Lake (second movement). The ballet originally had four movements:

Allegro
The Allegro is for four cowboys, eight girls (divided into two groups of four) and a lead couple. The lengthy Allegro goes for about ten minutes.

Adagio (Waltz)
The Adagio (Waltz) is for a lead couple and four girls representing horses. This movement is set at night. The cowboy is chasing after the lead girl who eludes him and eventually, after some flirtation, leaves without him.

Scherzo
The Scherzo was removed ca. 1960 due to the complex nature of the female bravura dancing required.

Rondo
The Rondo has a lead couple but is for the entire cast.

Music
Hershey Kay adapted and arranged the music from traditional Western melodies:

  
 Red River Valley
 Old Taylor
 Rye Whiskey

 Lolly-Too-Dum
 Good Night, Ladies
 Oh, Dem Golden Slippers
 The Girl I Left Behind Me

Although the movements are entitled Allegro, Adagio (Waltz) and Rondo they don't really remain true to their titles. There is an extended Adagio pas de deux section in the Allegro, and similarly with the Adagio, the Waltz speeds up to a lively tempo.

Original cast
 First movement: Allegro
  
 Diana Adams
and 8 women

 Herbert Bliss
and 4 men

 Second movement: Adagio
  
 Janet Reed
and 4 women

 Nicholas Magallanes

 Third movement: Scherzo
  
 Patricia Wilde
and 4 women

 André Eglevsky

 Fourth movement: Rondo
  
 Tanaquil LeClercq
and 4 women

 Jacques d'Amboise
and 4 men

References

 Playbill, New York City Ballet, Wednesday, April 30, 2008
 Repertory Week, New York City Ballet, Spring Season, 2008 repertory, week 1

Recording 

1959 KAPP records Inc. produced a recording by the New York City Ballet Orchestra, Robert Irving, Conductor.  Side one was "Stars and Stripes" and side two was "Western Symphony". KAPP Classics High Fidelity (KCL-9036)

Television broadcasts, filmography and videography

Television
 Australian television (Fourth movement Rondo) 1958
 French television, FR3 (Balanchine à Arc et Senans) 1977
 PBS, Dance in America, Balanchine (Fourth movement Rondo) 1984
 PBS, Dance in America, Balanchine in America (excluding the Third movement Scherzo) 1990
 PBS, Dance in America, The Balanchine Celebration (Fourth movement Rondo and finale) 1993
 BBC 2 (London) 1993

Film
 Monitor Productions, 1955

Video
 The Balanchine Library, The Balanchine Celebration, Part Two (Fourth movement Rondo, 1993), 1996
 Kultur, Balanchine (excerpts from the Second movement Adagio and Fourth movement Rondo), 2004

Reviews
 
 NY Times by John Martin, September 8, 1954
 NY Times by John Martin, October 31, 1962
 NY review by Clive Barnes, May 17, 1968

 NY Times by Jennifer Dunning, February 3, 1981
 NY Times by Jack Anderson, May 28, 2004
 NY Times by Alastair Macaulay, February 12, 2008
 NY Times by Alastair Macaulay, October 9, 2010

External links
 Western Symphony on the website of the Balanchine Trust

1954 ballet premieres
Ballets by George Balanchine
Ballets by Hershy Kay
Ballets designed by Barbara Karinska
Ballets designed by Jean Rosenthal
Ballets designed by John Boyd
New York City Ballet repertory